Bulyaga is an administrative ward in the Rungwe district of the Mbeya Region of Tanzania. In 2016 the Tanzania National Bureau of Statistics report there were 7,046 people in the ward, from 6,393 in 2012, and 7,869 in 2002.

Neighborhoods 
The ward has 4 neighborhoods.
 Mpindo
 Bulyaga Juu
 Bulyaga Kati
 Igamba

References 

Wards of Mbeya Region